Carole Shammas (born October 21, 1943) is an American historian, academic and author. She holds the John R. Hubbard Chair Emeritus in history at the University of Southern California and previously served as the department chair from 2000–03. Her work has explored socioeconomic history of North America, Great Britain and the Atlantic World prior to the mid-nineteenth century. She has written books and articles on the subjects of inheritance, consumption, and household government. Her daughter is the musician Julia Holter.

Shammas got her bachelor's and master's degrees from the University of Southern California and her Ph.D. from Johns Hopkins University.

References

21st-century American historians
21st-century American male writers
University of Southern California faculty
University of Southern California alumni
Johns Hopkins University alumni
1943 births
Living people
American women historians
21st-century American women writers
Historians from California
American male non-fiction writers